The Air Defense Artillery School is the professional school of the Air Defense Artillery Branch of the US Army. It is at Fort Sill, Oklahoma. The school was organized as the 6th ADA Brigade until 18 May 2012, when it was redesignated as the 30th Air Defense Artillery Brigade.  The decision to redesignate the 6th ADA to 30th ADA was made after Col. Bill Stacey, the then-6th ADA commander, discovered that the 6th ADA had no official ADA colors.

Current status
In June 2009, the Army Air Defense Artillery School and the 6th ADA Brigade relocated from Fort Bliss to Fort Sill. This move was a result of the 2005 BRAC moves. The motor transport operator (88M) course has moved to Fort Leonard Wood. There is a new Army policy replacing drill sergeants at AIT with regular noncommissioned officers from front line units. This is to free up drill sergeants for basic training. However, starting in 2018 Drill Sergeants made a comeback, somewhat due to 'disciplinary' issues amongst trainees.
 1st Battalion, 56th ADA Regiment is part of the 6th ADA Brigade. After 2005, 1–56 ADA was broken up and the soldiers were assigned to different battalions based on their military occupational specialty and systems they train on. Officer training is the only function of 1–56 ADA today.
 2nd Battalion, 6th ADA Regiment, with C-RAM, Sentinel, Stinger/Avenger
 3rd Battalion, 6th ADA Regiment, with MIM-104 Patriot, THAAD

See also
 Camp Davis

References

External links
 https://web.archive.org/web/20131029194507/http://www.airdefenseartillery.com/online/2010/CoastArtilleryHome.htm
 http://www.skylighters.org/places/intro.html
 

Air defense artillery units of the United States Army
Comanche County, Oklahoma
United States Army schools
Military in Oklahoma
Military installations established in 1942
1942 establishments in Oklahoma